Ginette Laurin C.M. (born in Montreal 3 January 1955) is  a Canadian dancer, choreographer and  artistic director. In 1984, she founded the dance group named O Vertigo, based in Montreal. O Vertigo is dedicated to creation in new dance and to broadcasting Ginette Laurin's works all over the world.

Biography
Trained as a gymnast and in modern dance and classical ballet in Montreal and New York City, Ginette Laurin began her dancing career in Montreal at the beginning of the 1970s. After creating several works as a choreographer, she founded O Vertigo, a company known for its expressive power and the unerring realization of its artistic vision. Besides creating works at O Vertigo, Ginette Laurin has choreographs pieces for other dance companies including Les Grands Ballets Canadiens and Introdans in the Netherlands, and for film. She also transmits her knowledge as an instructor at Université du Québec à Montréal (UQAM) and at European festivals, and through workshops held by O Vertigo.
With more than 50 choreographical works to her credit and acclaimed worldwide, Ginette Laurin is one of the foremost figures in contemporary dance in Canada.

She was profiled in Moze Mossanen's 1987 documentary film Dance for Modern Times, alongside David Earle, James Kudelka, Christopher House and Danny Grossman.

Main choreographies 
1979 : Sept fois passera
1980 : L'Inceste
1987 : Full House
1989 : Chagall
1992 : La Chambre Blanche (recreated in 2008)
1995 : Horizon; 1.60 
1997 : En Dedans
1997 : La Bête
1999 : La Vie qui bat (cover version in 2009)
2001 : Luna
2004 : La Résonance du double
2006 : ANGELs
2007 : Études #3 pour cordes et poulie de Laurin
2010 : Onde de choc
2012 : KHAOS
2014 : Soif

Films and videos 
1996: Night of the Flood (La Nuit du déluge)
2005 : Wire Frame also known as Point de fuite
2009 : la chambre blanche

Awards 
2015 : Order of Canada
2006 : Award for Best Canadian Work at the International Festival of Films on Art (FIFA) for Wire Frame, a television adaptation of the work Passare.   
2003 : Cinedance Award for Best Direction at the Moving Pictures Festival in Toronto for the short film Passare
2002 : Prix reconnaissance UQAM (Université du Québec à Montréal), Arts Faculty for the exceptional manner in which Ginette Laurin has promoted her field of study here and abroad.
1993 : Grand Prix du Conseil des arts de la Communauté urbaine de Montréal for the excellence of the production La Chambre Blanche.
1986 : Jean A. Chalmers Award to Ginette Laurin for outstanding choreography, given by the Ontario Arts Council.

References

External links 
 O Vertigo’s web site

1955 births
Living people
Artists from Montreal
Canadian choreographers
Canadian company founders
Canadian contemporary dancers
Canadian female dancers
Canadian women company founders
Members of the Order of Canada
Canadian women choreographers